Russell McInnes (10 December 1912 – 5 November 1991) was an  Australian rules footballer who played with Fitzroy and South Melbourne in the Victorian Football League (VFL).

Notes

External links 
		

1912 births
1991 deaths
Australian rules footballers from Victoria (Australia)
Fitzroy Football Club players
Sydney Swans players